The Poland women's national under-20 basketball team is a national basketball team of Poland, administered by the Polish Basketball Association. It represents the country in women's international under-20 basketball competitions.

FIBA U20 Women's European Championship participations

See also
Poland women's national basketball team
Poland women's national under-19 basketball team

References

External links
Archived records of Poland team participations

Basketball in Poland
Basketball
Women's national under-20 basketball teams